The Cayuga Hojack Trail is one of two Hojack trails in New York, the other being the Webster Hojack Trail in Webster. Both are built on remnants of the Hojack, a common name for the Rome, Watertown and Ogdensburg Railroad. Cayuga County maintains the  trail, which intersects the Cato–Fair Haven Trail south of Fair Haven. Both trails are used by snowmobiles in winter, equestrians, bicyclists, and hikers in the summer.

External links 
 Hojack Trail - Cayuga County Parks and Trails Map
 Route of the trail

Protected areas of Cayuga County, New York